Narain Singh Keshari is an Indian politician and member of the Bharatiya Janata Party. Keshari was a member of the Madhya Pradesh Legislative Assembly from the Agar constituency in Agar Malwa district.

References 

People from Agar Malwa district
Bharatiya Janata Party politicians from Madhya Pradesh
Madhya Pradesh MLAs 1990–1992
Living people
21st-century Indian politicians
Year of birth missing (living people)